The Hoot (Whale) is an Iranian supercavitation torpedo claimed to travel at approximately , several times faster than a conventional torpedo. It was claimed to have been successfully test-fired from a surface ship against a dummy submarine during the Iranian military exercise "Great Prophet" on 2 April 2006 and 3 April 2006. Iran test-fired the torpedo within its territorial waters in the Strait of Hormuz in May 2017.

The official Iranian news agency IRNA claims the torpedo was produced and developed by the Islamic Revolutionary Guard Corps. Most military and industry analysts have concluded that the Hoot is reverse engineered from the Russian VA-111 Shkval supercavitation torpedo which travels at the same speed.

See also
 List of supercavitating torpedoes

References

External links
 BBC: Iran tests 'super-fast' torpedo

Post–Cold War weapons of Iran
Supercavitating torpedoes
Military equipment introduced in the 2000s